Hamza Adnan (born February 8, 1996) is an Iraqi professional footballer who currently plays for Al-Quwa Al-Jawiya in the Iraqi Premier League.

International debut
On October 3, 2015 Hamza Adnan made his first international cap with Iraq against Jordan in a friendly match.

References

External links
 

Iraqi footballers
1996 births
Living people
Iraq international footballers
Sportspeople from Basra
Al-Mina'a SC players
Association football fullbacks